Commandment may refer to:
 The Ten Commandments
 One of the 613 mitzvot of Judaism
 The Great Commandment
 The New Commandment
 Commandment (album), a 2007 album by Six Feet Under
 Commandments (film), a 1997 film starring Aidan Quinn

See also
 First Commandment (disambiguation)
 Second Commandment (disambiguation)